Pterotrachea is a taxonomic genus of medium-sized to large floating sea slugs, marine pelagic gastropod molluscs in the family Pterotracheidae, which is in the infraorder Littorinimorpha. As such they are quite closely related to such families as the tritons (Ranellidae) and the tun shells (Tonnidae).

These pelagic slugs are not at all closely related to the pelagic opisthobranch gastropods such as the sea angels and sea butterflies.

Species
Species within the genus Pterotrachea include:
 Pterotrachea coronata Forskål, 1775
 Pterotrachea hippocampus Philippi, 1836
 Pterotrachea keraudrenii J. E. Gray, 1850
 Pterotrachea minuta
 Pterotrachea scutata Gegenbaur, 1855
Taxon inquirendum
 Pterotrachea talismani Vayssière, 1902

References
 
 Powell A W B, New Zealand Mollusca, William Collins Publishers Ltd, Auckland, New Zealand 1979

External links
 Niebuhr C. (ed.) (1775). Descriptiones animalium avium, amphibiorum, piscium, insectorum, vermium quae in itinere orientali observavit Petrus Forskål, prof. Haun., post mortem auctoris edidit Carsten Niebuhr. Hauniae [Copengagen], Möller, pp. 1–19 + i-xxxiv + 1-164, 1 ma
 Tree of Life: Pterotrachea

Pterotracheidae